The Fall River is a  river in southern Vermont and northern Massachusetts, joining the Connecticut River just downstream from Turners Falls, Massachusetts.

The river rises on the eastern slopes of East Mountain in Guilford, Vermont, and flows southward into Bernardston, Massachusetts. For nearly its entire length in Bernardston it is followed by U.S. Route 5 and Interstate 91, flowing for most of that distance between the two highways. South of Bernardston the river forms the boundary between the town of Gill and the city of Greenfield. The Fall River enters the Connecticut River directly across from the village of Turners Falls within the town of Montague and just downstream from the Turners Falls dam.

See also
List of rivers of Massachusetts

References 

Rivers of Vermont
Rivers of Franklin County, Massachusetts
Tributaries of the Connecticut River
Rivers of Massachusetts
Rivers of Windham County, Vermont